Trond Børge Henriksen (born 28 April 1964, in Trondheim) is a Norwegian football coach and former player. He is the father of Rosenborg BK midfielder Markus Henriksen.

Biography
Trond Henriksen played in Rosenborg from 1983 to 1993 as a wingback, achieving five Norwegian Premier League championships and three Norwegian Football Cup wins. His uncompromising playing style made him a hero amongst the fans, and he was nicknamed Rambo after the movie character. He still holds the record of 29 yellow cards in Rosenborg. He worked as a postman until he became full-time coach for Rosenborg's youth team. When Knut Tørum became Rosenborg's head coach in 2006, Henriksen was promoted to assistant coach. After Knut Tørum resigned on 25 October 2007, Henriksen was promoted to head coach. He later went back to in his former position as assistant coach under head coach Jan Jönsson. In June 2020 he took on the role of caretaker manager of Rosenborg BK, a position he had until 1. September 2020.

Managerial Stats (all official matches)

Honours
Rosenborg as player
Norwegian Premier League Championship: 1985, 1988, 1990, 1992, 1993
Norwegian Premier League Runner up: 1989, 1991
Norwegian Cup Win: 1988, 1990, 1992
Norwegian Cup Runner up: 1991

Rosenborg as assistant coach
Norwegian Premier League Championship: 2009, 2010, 2018

References

External links

1964 births
Living people
Norwegian footballers
Norwegian football managers
Rosenborg BK managers
Eliteserien managers
Rosenborg BK players
Eliteserien players
Association football defenders
Footballers from Trondheim